Brownville is an unincorporated community in DeSoto County, Florida, United States, located  north northeast of the city of Arcadia.

Unincorporated communities in DeSoto County, Florida
Unincorporated communities in Florida